Wooster Collective is a website founded in 2003 that showcases street art from around the world. The New York Times called it "a leading street-art blog." It features ephemeral art placed on streets in cities around the world. The site also offers podcasting with music and interviews featuring street artists. The name Wooster comes from Wooster Street, located in the SoHo neighborhood of New York City.

The website's archive starts in January 2003, and the category list is over 100 items long.  Categories include entries as "Cardboard" art and "Guerrilla gardening", as well as locations with a street art presence such as Tokyo, Dublin and Milwaukee.  It also contains interviews of street artists, with reviews of artists' new work or of recent gallery exhibits.

11 Spring Street Project 
Wooster Collective was involved in gaining recognition for street art in its own neighborhood. In 2006,the website collaborated with Caroline Cummings and Bill Elias, members of a development group, with the idea of turning the building located at 11 Spring Street in New York City into a temporary street art gallery.  The address was about to be converted into condominium apartments.

The idea for the project was set forth when Elias Cummings contacted the Wooster Collective site and suggested that they curate a show at the location to celebrate the building's place in the history of street art.

The show ran for three days, from December 15 to December 17, 2006.  Street artists who had been featured in the Wooster Collective, such as Shepard Fairey, Swoon, Dan Witz, Above, Bo130,  Doze Green, D*Face, The London Police, Skewville, Lady Pink, Microbo, Jace, Kostas Seremetis, John Fekner and Don Leicht, Ruslan Karablin, Graffiti Research Lab, Will Barras, WK Interact, and many more participated in the event.  The art was left on the walls and built over (a nod to a tradition in construction of leaving newspapers in the walls of a house as a sort of "time capsule"), thereby leaving a legacy of street art behind for future excavators.

Books 
In 2012, Wooster Collective released the second in a series of 'Wooster on Paper' books called Graphite which featured pencil drawings by a number of their favourite artists including Paul Alexander Thornton, Connor Harrington and Word to Mother.

References

External links

Online mass media companies of the United States
Art websites